Longue-Rive is a municipality in the Côte-Nord region of the province of Quebec in Canada. The municipality includes the communities of Sault-au-Mouton, Baie-des-Bacon, Pointe-à-Boisvert, Rivière-Éperlan and Saint-Paul-du-Nord.

History
On May 7, 1997, the Village Municipality of Sault-au-Mouton and the Municipality of Saint-Paul-du-Nord were merged into the new Municipality of Saint-Paul-du-Nord–Sault-au-Mouton. The municipal council had 12 months to request for a name change, in consultation with its population. The new name Longue-Rive was chosen out of a list of 10 options through a referendum on May 26, 1998, and approved by the government on September 22, 1998. Longue-Rive (French for "long shore") refers to the municipality's location along the north shores of the Saint Lawrence River.

Demographics

Population
Population trend:

Mother tongue:
 English as first language: 1.1%
 French as first language: 98.9%
 English and French as first language: 0%
 Other as first language: 0%

See also
 List of municipalities in Quebec

References 

Municipalities in Quebec
Incorporated places in Côte-Nord
La Haute-Côte-Nord Regional County Municipality